Paragus haemorrhous is a widespread species of hoverfly found in many parts of Europe, Africa and the Nearctic.

Description
It has small black lines. Tergites have red markings. Eye pilosity is uniform. Scutellum is black. Females cannot be identified.

See references for determination.

Distribution
Palearctic: Fennoscandia south to Iberia and the Mediterranean basin, Israel and Turkey, Ireland eastward through Central Europe and Southern Europe (Italy, the former Yugoslavia) into European Russia. Nearctic: from the Yukon south to Costa Rica also in parts of the Afrotropical region.

Biology
Habitat: Unimproved grassland, heathland, garrigue, dune grassland, open areas and pathsides in forest up to the Larix/Pinus uncinata zone, fen meadow. Flowers visited include umbellifers, Calluna, Jasione montana, Matricaria, Origanum, Polygonum, Potentilla, Solidago, Stellaria. It flies May to September. The larva feeds on aphids on low herbaceous plants.

Molecular genetics
As "based on both morphological and molecular evidence", Paragus haemorrhous Meigen 1822, Paragus coadunatus (Rondani, 1847) and Paragus ascoensis Goeldlin de Tiefenau & Lucas, 1981 appear to be synonyms of Paragus tibialis (Fallén, 1817)". Rojo et al (2006).

References

External links
External images 

Diptera of Europe
Syrphinae
Insects described in 1822